Cambridge Systematics, Inc. is an independent, employee-owned transportation consultancy firm with corporate headquarters located in Medford, Massachusetts.  Cambridge Systematics provides strategic planning and management services, objective analysis, and technology applications for passenger, commercial, freight, and transit systems to public and private sectors both nationally and internationally.

Cambridge Systematics provides services in public transportation, urban design, climate change, environmental impact assessment, sustainability, sustainable transport, land use planning, forecasting, modeling, asset management, public-private partnership, infrastructure, and logistics.

The firm’s staff members are associated with the Transportation Research Board, American Planning Association, ITS America, Governors Highway Safety Association, American Society of Civil Engineers, and the Institute of Transportation Engineers.

Company history
The company was founded on September 27, 1972 by four Massachusetts Institute of Technology professors and a colleague in Cambridge, Massachusetts under the charter of “the application of systematic analysis to problems of transportation, the environment, urban development, and regional planning.”

Cambridge Systematics grew rapidly within its first few years and opened a second office in September 1976 in Berkeley, California, that moved to its current location in Oakland, California in 1994.

Since then, the company has relocated its corporate headquarters to Medford, Massachusetts and opened additional offices in Washington, D.C.; Chicago, Illinois; Tallahassee, Florida; Fort Lauderdale, Florida; New York, New York; Atlanta, Georgia; Austin, Texas; Denver, Colorado; Los Angeles, California; and Raleigh, North Carolina.  Cambridge Systematics staff members also provide onsite client support at the offices of the Federal Highway Administration and the Volpe National Transportation Systems Center.

Services

 Policy, Strategic Planning, & Management
 Economic Analysis
 Environment and Transportation
 Freight Systems & Intermodal Planning
 Transit & Shared Mobility
 Rail Planning
 Travel Demand Forecasting 
Mobility Analytics
 Operations & Simulation
 Performance Management
 Transportation Safety
 Software & Information Technology Consulting
 GIS & Data Management

References

External links 
 Official website

Consulting firms of the United States
Employee-owned companies of the United States
Companies based in Cambridge, Massachusetts
American companies established in 1972